Ang Panday is a 1980 Filipino action-fantasy film produced and directed by Fernando Poe Jr., who also stars as the titular character. It is based on the fictional comics character of the same name, created by Carlo J. Caparas and illustrated by Steve Gan.

The film was followed by three sequels, which also featuring Poe as Flavio, namely Pagbabalik ng Panday (1981), Ang Panday: Ikatlong Yugto (1982) and Ang Panday IV: Ika-Apat Na Aklat (1984). All four films were shown at the Metro Manila Film Festival in their respective years.

An animated TV series, dubbed as the first full-length Filipino animation series, was shown in RPN 9 during the mid-1980s. It was patterned after the storyline of the first movie.

Plot
Flavio (Fernando Poe, Jr.) is a "Panday" (or blacksmith) whose village and land are under the reign of the tyrant Lizardo (Max Alvarado). Flavio is forced to brand innocent children every night with Lizardo's mark by the head of Lizardo's men in the village, Pilo (Paquito Diaz).

One day, Flavio's predecessor as Panday, Tata Temyong (Lito Anzures) finds the legendary "Black Book" that supposedly tells how Lizardo can be defeated. Later that night a meteorite lands in a nearby field. Based on a prophecy in the Black Book, Flavio and Tata Temyong then use the meteorite and an old bell to create a magic dagger, the only weapon that can defeat Lizardo. After finishing the weapon Flavio hunts down Lizardo's men in the village, he brands them before setting off with Tata Temyong, his young apprentice Lando (Bentot Jr.), and Monica (Liz Alindogan), a woman he had saved from Lizardo's men, to free the land.

On their way to Lizardo, they come across a seaside hut that is home to one of Lizardo's henchmen, a wizard. Flavio defeats him, but soon afterward they are attacked by siyokoy (mermen) that are driven away when Flavio's dagger hums, and when Pilo arrives seeking revenge against Flavio, they attack him and his men instead. Later Flavio and his companions are attacked by zombies in a forest. Tata Temyong and Monica end up captured and brought to Lizardo's fortress by his men. Elsewhere Lando finds refuge in a hut haunted by an aswang, and after a chase, Flavio finds and defeats it with his dagger.

Lizardo later challenges Flavio to a duel, and brings Tata Temyong, Monica, and all his slaves to witness the battle. He first orders his men to attack Flavio, who, though vastly outnumbered, defeats them after his dagger transforms into a sword. Lizardo then faces Flavio himself, only to rapidly age every time Flavio hits him. Flavio ends the duel by stabbing Lizardo in the chest, who dies and fades away. With Lizardo defeated, Flavio leads his companions and the former slaves to freedom.

Cast
Fernando Poe, Jr. as Flavio
Max Alvarado as Lizardo
Bentot Jr. as Lando
Liz Alindogan as Monica
Paquito Diaz as Pilo
Lito Anzures as Tata Temio
Victor Bravo
Max Laurel
Vic Varrion

Production
Shooting for the film was done in Paoay, Ilocos Norte.

Release
Ang Panday was released at the 6th Metro Manila Film Festival on December 25, 1980.

Restoration
The film was restored by FPJ Productions in 2014.

Accolades

See also
Panday (comics)
Pandoy: Ang Alalay ng Panday
Panday (2005 TV series)
Ang Panday (2009 film)
Ang Panday 2
Ang Panday (2016 TV series)
Ang Panday (2017 film)
Ang Panday (song)

References

External links

Panday
1980 films
Filipino-language films
Films based on Philippine comics
Films shot in Ilocos Norte
FPJ Productions films
Live-action films based on comics
Philippine films based on comics
Films directed by Fernando Poe Jr.